Ferid Vokopola (18 August 1887 – 28 June 1969) was an Albanian politician, theologist, translator and a delegate of Lushnjë in the Assembly of Vlora held on 28 November 1912, and one of the 40 signatories of the Albanian Declaration of Independence.

Life
He was born on August 18, 1887 in the village of Vokopolë in Berat, then part of Ottoman Empire. In early 19th century, his family moved to the city of Berat, where he completed his elementary school. He completed the high school in Istanbul, where he later also completed his university studies in law and economics. After finishing school, he returned in Berat and lived for several years in the city, where he served as a lawyer in the city.
In November 1912 he was elected delegate of Lushnjë in the National Assembly of Vlora and he was youngest among all participants. Signed the Declaration of Independence with the initials “M. Ferit Vokopola ”. He was the  among the signatories of Independence and a delegate of Vlora.

In 1920 was one of the organizers of the Congress of Lushnja. He was among the founders of the Madrasah of Tirana and collaborator of secular and religious press. He was the first to translate Quran from English into Albanian. In 1914 he was Minister of Agriculture. During this time he developed the rules for translation of the Quran. He was a prominent representative of Islamic Mysticism in Albania, in the first half of the 20th century, and was ranked as one of the most important Albanian specializing in Persian studies. He was a well-known figure of his time. In 1920-1928 he was elected Member of Parliament of Vlora, and during the years 1928-1939 he was Member of Parliament of Berat. He was the First Secretary of the Congress of Lushnja. He wrote anthem of the Congress. He was a very successful politician, economist, theologian, poet, philosopher and essayist.

References

19th-century Albanian politicians
20th-century Albanian politicians
Signatories of the Albanian Declaration of Independence
1887 births
1969 deaths
People from Berat
People from Janina vilayet
Government ministers of Albania
Agriculture ministers of Albania
Members of the Parliament of Albania
Albanian economists
All-Albanian Congress delegates
Congress of Lushnjë delegates
Translators of the Quran into Albanian
Sufi poets
Turkish–Albanian translators
20th-century translators
Istanbul University Faculty of Law alumni